Toy Story Toons: Hawaiian Vacation is a 2011 American computer-animated short film produced by Pixar Animation Studios and directed by Gary Rydstrom. The first entry in the Toy Story Toons series, the short features characters from the Toy Story films and takes place after the events of Toy Story 3. It premiered in theaters with Pixar's Cars 2, and was included on the film's home video release.

Plot 
Three months after the events of Toy Story 3 
It is Bonnie's winter break from school, and she is going on vacation to Hawaii with her family. The toys are excited to have a week of relaxation, but Ken and Barbie reveal themselves to have stowed away in Bonnie's backpack, hoping to join her in Hawaii. Bonnie leaves them in her room, however, much to Ken's horror and disappointment when he realizes they are not going to Hawaii. Barbie reveals to Woody that Ken planned to have their first kiss on a beach at sunset (based on a travel brochure), first having Mr Potato Head question that they haven't kissed yet, and then that leads to Mrs. Potato head elbowing him and knocking him over. Also inspiring Woody, Buzz, and the rest of Bonnie's toys to work together and recreate their own version of Hawaii for the two. After various adventures in "Hawaii", Ken and Barbie share their first kiss in the snow at sunset, recreating the scene from the brochure. However, the two step off the edge of the porch without realizing it and end up buried in the snow.

In a post-credits scene, the other toys are trying to free them from a block of ice in which they are now frozen by using a hairdryer to melt the ice as Buzz (who's been reset to normal) describes it as the best vacation ever. Woody agrees with Buzz as Mr. Potato Head tries chiseling the ice with a screwdriver.

Voice cast

 Tom Hanks as Woody
 Tim Allen as Buzz Lightyear
 Joan Cusack as Jessie
 Don Rickles as Mr. Potato Head
 Estelle Harris as Mrs. Potato Head
 Wallace Shawn as Rex
 John Ratzenberger as Hamm
 Blake Clark as Slinky Dog
 Jeff Pidgeon as Aliens
 Jodi Benson as Barbie
 Michael Keaton as Ken
 Emily Hahn as Bonnie
 Lori Alan as Bonnie's mom
 Timothy Dalton as Mr. Pricklepants
 Jeff Garlin as Buttercup
 Kristen Schaal as Trixie
 Bonnie Hunt as Dolly
 Bud Luckey as Chuckles
 Zoe Levin as Peas-in-a-Pod
 Angus MacLane as Captain Zip
 Axel Geddes as Rexing Ball
 Javier Fernández-Peña as Spanish Buzz

Production
The film was announced in June 2010 by Lee Unkrich who said, "We have announced we're going to do a short film in front of Cars 2 that uses the Toy Story characters. We're going to keep them alive; they're not going away forever." The short film's title and plot were later revealed on February 17, 2011.

Reception
Charlie McCollum of Mercury News called it a "delightful snippet of life" that is "crisp, funny and sweet."

Home media
On November 1, 2011, Hawaiian Vacation was released as a bonus feature on the Cars 2 DVD and Blu-ray. As of July 2012, Hawaiian Vacation is available as a digital purchase on Amazon Video and iTunes Store. The short was released on November 13, 2012, on the DVD and Blu-ray Disc of Pixar Short Films Collection Volume 2. The short film was released on Blu-ray and DVD on August 19, 2014, with Toy Story of Terror! and two other Toy Story Toons.

References

External links

 
 
 

2011 films
2011 computer-animated films
2010s American animated films
2010s animated short films
Films scored by Mark Mothersbaugh
Films directed by Gary Rydstrom
Pixar short films
Toy Story
Films about Barbie
Films about dolls
Films about vacationing
2010s English-language films